Acoustically Driven is a live video released in VHS and DVD format by British rock band Uriah Heep in 2001. The video was shot live with an orchestra and choir. It was published also in a two disc set with a DVD of the live concert.

Track listings
 "Introduction" – 0:47
 "Why Did You Go?" – 3:59
 "The Easy Road" – 2:41
 "Echoes in the Dark" – 4:44
 "Come Back to Me" – 4:40
 "Cross That Line" – 5:56
 "The Golden Palace" – 8:17
 "The Shadows and the Wind" – 4:30
 "Wonderworld" – 4:33
 "Different World" – 5:03
 "Circus" – 4.21
 "Blind Eye" – 3:37
 "Traveller in Time" – 2:50
 "More Fool You" – 3:30
 "Lady in Black" – 6:15
 "Medley: The Wizard /  / Circle of Hands" – 9:24

Personnel
Uriah Heep
Mick Box – guitar, vocals
Lee Kerslake – drums, vocals
Trevor Bolder – bass guitar, vocals
Phil Lanzon – keyboards, vocals, string arrangements
Bernie Shaw – lead vocal

Additional musicians
Ian Anderson – flute on "Circus" and "Blind Eye"
The Uriah Heep Classic Rock Music Ensemble:
Liz Chi Yen Liew – first violin
Sarah Chi Liew – second violin
Saskia Tomkins – viola
Pauline Kirke – cello
Steafan Hannigan – uilleann pipes and percussion
Melvin Duffy – pedal steel and slide guitar
Pip Williams – additional acoustic guitar on "Lady in Black", strings arrangements
Kim Chandler – flute on "The Easy Road", "The Golden Palace" and "More Fool You", backing vocals
Emma Robbins – backing vocals
Billie Godfrey – backing vocals

References

2001 live albums
Uriah Heep (band) live albums
Albums with cover art by Roger Dean (artist)
2001 video albums
Live video albums